Souss-Massa is one of the twelve regions of Morocco. It covers an area of 51,642 km² and had a population of 2,676,847 as of the 2014 Moroccan census. The capital of the region is Agadir.

Geography
Souss-Massa borders the regions of Marrakesh-Safi to the north, Drâa-Tafilalet to the northeast and Guelmim-Oued Noun to the southwest. To the southeast is Algeria's Tindouf Province. The region faces the Atlantic Ocean on its western side: much of the coast is protected by Souss-Massa National Park. The interior of the region is dominated by the Anti-Atlas mountain range, while the Sous River runs across the northern part of the region, in the valley between the Anti-Atlas and the High Atlas. The capital Agadir is located at the mouth of the Sous. Toubkal National Park extends into the northeastern corner of the region.

History
Souss-Massa was formed in September 2015 by merging Tata Province, formerly part of Guelmim-Es Semara region, with five provinces of the former Souss-Massa-Drâa region.

Government
 of the RNI was elected as the regional council's first president on 14 September 2015. He had previously headed the Souss-Massa-Drâa regional council. Zineb El Adaoui was appointed governor (wali) of the region on 13 October 2015. He was succeeded by Ahmed Hajji in 2017.

Subdivisions

Souss-Massa comprises two prefectures and four provinces:
Agadir-Ida Ou Tanane Prefecture
Chtouka-Aït Baha Province
Inezgane-Aït Melloul Prefecture
Taroudannt Province
Tata Province
Tiznit Province

Economy
Agriculture is a major economic activity in the Sous and Massa river basins located in the northwestern part of the region. Industries related to the processing of agricultural and seafood products are also concentrated in the same area. Agadir is an important fishing and tourist port. Tiznit is known for its traditional silverwork.

Infrastructure
The A7 motorway connects Agadir with Marrakesh and Casablanca. The major north–south road through the region is the N1, while the N10 runs east–west in the Sous River valley, connecting Agadir to Taroudannt and Ouarzazate. Agadir is a major port city in Morocco and also has an international airport.

References